Lieutenant General Arundell David Leakey,  (born 18 May 1952) is a former British Army officer. He was Director General of the European Union Military Staff in the Council of the European Union, Brussels. In 2010 he was appointed Gentleman Usher of the Black Rod, a role he held until February 2018.

Early life and family

Leakey is the son of Major General Rea Leakey and nephew of Victoria Cross recipient Nigel Leakey. Leakey was educated at Sherborne School. He is also related to the Victoria Cross recipient Joshua Leakey.

Military career
After attending the Royal Military Academy Sandhurst, Leakey was commissioned into the Royal Tank Regiment as a second lieutenant (on probation) on 27 February 1971. His service number was 491002. From 4 September 1971 to 1 July 1974 he was a university cadet while he read law at Fitzwilliam College, University of Cambridge. His commission was confirmed on 1 July 1974 with seniority from 1 February 1971. He was promoted to lieutenant on 1 July 1974 with seniority from 1 February 1973, and to captain on 1 August 1977. He served in the UK, Northern Ireland, Germany, Bosnia and in Canada in armoured vehicles and in tanks (Chieftain and Challenger).

Having attended the Staff College, Camberley, Leakey was promoted to major on 30 September 1984. He was appointed Chief of Staff at 7th Armoured Brigade (Germany), Military Assistant to the Chief of the Defence Staff and then Commanding Officer of the 2nd Royal Tank Regiment.

Leakey was promoted to colonel on 31 December 1993 with seniority from 30 June 1993. He was then posted to the Ministry of Defence as a Colonel Military Operations. In that role, he was responsible for Operational planning and policy affecting Eastern and Western Europe. In early 1995, he attended the Higher Command and Staff Course. In late 1995, he was the UK's Military Representative at the peace negotiations to end the Bosnian War held in the United States. The successful negotiations resulted in the signing of the Dayton Agreement and an end to the three-and-a-half-year-long war.

Leakey was promoted to brigadier on 31 December 1995 with seniority from 30 June 1995. He was appointed Commander of 20th Armoured Brigade in Germany in 1996. With his brigade, he was posted to the former Yugoslavia from 21 December 1996 to 20 June 1997. He returned to the Ministry of Defence as Director of Military Operations from July 1997 to December 1999.

In 2000, Leakey attended the Royal College of Defence Studies. He was Chief of Staff at Headquarters Northern Ireland from February to December 2001. He was promoted to major general on 15 December 2001. From December 2001 to October 2004, he was Director General of Army Training and Recruiting. On 6 October 2004, he was appointed Commander of European Union Force Althea, the European Union peacekeeping force, which replaced the NATO-led SFOR in Bosnia and Herzegovina. He was promoted to lieutenant general on 28 February 2007. From 1 March 2007 until 2010, he was Director General of the European Union Military Staff in Brussels.

Leakey retired from the military on 22 September 2010.

Later life
Leakey was appointed as Gentleman Usher of the Black Rod in the House of Lords from February 2011 to December 2017. In early 2020 Leakey argued strongly against former Speaker of the House of Commons John Bercow being appointed to the House of Lords, accusing him of bullying and explosive behaviour. Shadow Home Secretary and Member of Parliament Diane Abbott has defended Bercow, stating that as a military man, Leakey was "unlikely to have been bullied by Bercow". She was roundly criticized for these comments.

Since retiring as Black Rod, Leakey has undertaken public speaking engagements including media appearances on radio and TV. He mentors senior executives and holds appointments in a number of business enterprises: Chief Strategy Officer of Scopeworker (a business management software service), Advisory Member of 2M Holdings Board (Chemicals and Gas Industry), a number of consultancy roles, and ambassador for the Hollie Gazzard Trust.

Personal life
Leakey was chairman of the National Children's Orchestra, but he resigned in June 2014.

He was appointed a Governor of Sherborne School and Sherborne School Group in 2018 and chairman in July 2020. He is also a trustee of numerous other Charitable and not for profit organisations.

He is an amateur piano player and singer. He is married with two sons. He enjoys classical music, playing squash, tennis, golf, most field sports, and chain sawing.

Honours and awards
Leakey was Colonel Commandant of the Royal Tank Regiment from 21 August 2006 to 30 July 2010 and previously Deputy Colonel Commandant since 16 July 1999. He is Honorary Colonel of the Dorset Yeomanry and Dorset Army Cadet Force as well as Colonel of Cadet Force Music.

References

External links
 David Leakey speaks to BBC Hardtalk on his mission in Bosnia and Hercegovina

1952 births
British military personnel of The Troubles (Northern Ireland)
Living people
Alumni of Fitzwilliam College, Cambridge
Graduates of the Royal College of Defence Studies
British Army lieutenant generals
British officials of the European Union
Companions of the Order of St Michael and St George
Commanders of the Royal Victorian Order
Commanders of the Order of the British Empire
Directors General of the European Union Military Staff
Graduates of the Royal Military Academy Sandhurst
Graduates of the Staff College, Camberley
David
People educated at Sherborne School
Recipients of the Commendation for Valuable Service
Royal Tank Regiment officers
Ushers of the Black Rod